The Paddock Shops is a shopping complex in the east end of Louisville, Kentucky USA, billed as a lifestyle center. Originally known as The Summit of Louisville, it is currently owned by Boston-based CPT Capital Management and managed by Chicago-based Fairbourne Properties. From its opening in 2001 until May 2013, it had been owned by a subsidiary of Prudential and managed by Birmingham, Alabama-based Bayer Properties.

The primary entrance is on Kentucky Route 22.

The shopping complex formally opened on November 1, 2001. On May 21, 2013, a Louisville business journal reported that CPT Capital Management had purchased the center for $111.5 million, and that Wilkow would take over from Bayer as property manager. Shortly after the sale, the new managers announced that the complex would be renamed via an online vote. Three choices were provided—Paddock Shops, Oaks Town Center, and Shops of Louisville—along with a write-in option. On August 15, 2013, Wilkow announced that the winning name was Paddock Shops, with nearly 30% of the vote, and new signage was immediately installed.

Anchors
The Paddock Shops has several anchor stores with Bed Bath & Beyond being the largest by square foot totaling just over 30,000. Barnes & Noble, Earth Fare, and Office Depot are smaller with square footage ranging in the mid twenties range. On May 16, 2015, Office Depot officially closed its doors, and Earth Fare departed as well. The lifestyle center also has junior anchors in Ulta Cosmetics and DSW.

External links
Paddock Shops
Fairbourne Properties

Economy of Louisville, Kentucky
Shopping malls in Kentucky
Shopping malls established in 2001
Lifestyle centers (retail)
Shopping districts and streets in the United States
Buildings and structures in Louisville, Kentucky